Edda Mutter (born 29 June 1970 in West Berlin) is a German former alpine skier who competed in the women's slalom at the 1994 Winter Olympics.

External links
 sports-reference.com
 

1970 births
Living people
German female alpine skiers
Olympic alpine skiers of Germany
Alpine skiers at the 1994 Winter Olympics
Sportspeople from Berlin
20th-century German women